The  was an experimental Japanese Shinkansen train built to test the technology for future high-speed trains operating at speeds of up to  following the opening of the Tokaido Shinkansen in 1964.

Formation
The Class 951 train was a two-car unit formed of cars numbered 951-1 and 951-2. Car 951-1 was built by Kawasaki Sharyo (present-day Kawasaki Heavy Industries), and had a seating capacity of 40 with seats arranged 3+2 abreast. Car 951-2 was built by Nippon Sharyo, and had a seating capacity of 50, also with seats arranged 3+2 abreast.

 951-1 (Mc)
 951-2 (M'c)

Both cars were fitted with a cross-arm type pantograph at the inner end. Both were based on the PS200 type used on the 0 Series Shinkansen trains, but the pantograph on car 951-1 was designated PS9010K, and that on car 951-2 was designated PS-1010A. Normally, only the pantograph on car 951-2 was used.

History
The train was unveiled to the press on 26 March 1969, with formal test running commencing on the Tōkaidō Shinkansen from 2 July 1969.

The train was formally withdrawn on 11 April 1980. Car 951-2 was transferred to the Railway Technical Research Institute in Kokubunji, Tokyo, where it was used for roller rig testing. Car 951-1 was donated to the nearby Hikari Plaza Community Centre in 1994, where it is open to the public. Car 951-2 was subsequently stored out of use inside the Railway Technical Research Institute, and was cut up in 2008.

References

External links

 Kokubunji Hikari Plaza information 

Experimental and prototype high-speed trains
951
Train-related introductions in 1969
Non-passenger multiple units
25 kV AC multiple units
Kawasaki multiple units
Nippon Sharyo multiple units